Events from the year 1736 in Denmark.

Incumbents
 Monarch – Christian VI
 Prime minister – Johan Ludvig Holstein-Ledreborg

Events
 30 April – Theatrum Anatomico-chirurgicum is inaugurated in Copenhagen and an exam in surgery is introduced.
 7 November – Laurits S. Winther establishes a ropewalk at Sortebrødre Torv in Odense which will eventually turn into Roulunds Fabrikker.

Undated
 Kurantbanken is established.
 The University of Copenhagen introduces a Candidate of Law degree.

Culture

 The Hermitage Hunting Lodge in Jægersborg Dyrehave is completed.
 North wing of house at Bregentved is constructed.
 Roskilde Royal Mansion is completed.
 The architects Lauritz de Thurah and Nicolai Eigtved are put in charge of designing the interior of the first Christiansborg Palace.
 A medal designed by Johann Carl Hedlinger is struck in commemoration of Christian VI's expansion of the royal naval fleet.

Births
 11 January – Christian Joseph Zuber, architect (died 1802)
 24 January – Jacob Nicolai Wilse, priest and meteorologist (died 1801)
 21 July – Jean Abraham Grill, businessman (died 1792)
 25 August – Frederik Georg Adeler, county official and landowner (died 1810)
 16 September – Johannes Nikolaus Tetens, philosopher, statesman and scientist (died 1807)

Full date missing
 Henrich Brandemann, architect (died 1803)
 Johann Clemens Tode, physician (died 1807)
 Helferich Peter Sturz, Postmaster-General (died 1779)

Deaths
 13 September – Christen Thomesen Sehested, admiral (born 1664)
 23 January – Adam Christopher Knuth, 1st Count of Knuthenborg (born 1687)
 27 September – Karen Brahe, book collector (born 1657)

References

External links

 
1730s in Denmark
Years of the 18th century in Denmark